Madani Girls School is an Islamic independent secondary school in Whitechapel, London Borough of Tower Hamlets, East London.

It also operates a college and alimah programme. The school opened in September 1991.

Building History
The main (southern) school building was originally occupied by Myrdle Street Central School. It was designed in 1905 by Thomas Jerram Bailey, the Architect of the Education Department of the London County Council. Myrdle Street was one of the first of the LCC's "central schools" that offered higher than elementary education. The building is described in the Pevsner Architectural Guide for London East as a "unique, outstanding design" featuring two semicircular staircase towers with copper domes. It became a Grade II Listed building in 1973.

Notable former pupils of the Myrdle Street Central School include Hannah Billig, a British-Jewish doctor who worked in the East End during the London Blitz when she became known as "The Angel of Cable Street". Also Morris Harold Davis, the President of the Federation of Synagogues (1928–1944) and Labour Party politician.

After World War II, it became a special school changing its name to Grenfell Special School, which finally closed on 31 July 1999. In 1977, the school began to be used as a social center for the local Bangladeshi community including evening language classes.

In 2001, Madani Girls' School leased to the building from the council to use as an independent school. In 2008, they purchased the building from Tower Hamlets council.

In 2020, construction for a two storey annex building with a playground started. Construction is intended to be completed in December 2021. The building is called the Madani Hub.

References

External links

 Madani Girls School

Private schools in the London Borough of Tower Hamlets
Islamic schools in London
Educational institutions established in 1991
1991 establishments in England
Private girls' schools in London